Avalancha (Spanish for "Avalanche") is the fourth and final studio album released by Spanish rock band Héroes del Silencio in 1995. It is the only album in which Mexican guitarist Alan Bogulavsky plays as a full-time member of the band. It is to date their last studio recorded album. It is considered a turning point in the Rock en Español movement of the 90's and a classic in its own right. It was produced by Bob Ezrin (Lou Reed, Pink Floyd, Peter Gabriel, Alice Cooper, Kansas, Kiss, etc.) and recorded mostly in different studios in the Los Angeles area. It was followed by a very successful 18-month world tour after which the band went on hiatus until the announcement of a 10 date world tour in early 2007.

Reception
The album reached the top position in the Spanish album charts and scored positions among the top 20 in three other European countries. The video for the single "La Chispa Adecuada" was chosen as 'video of the year' at the 1996 Billboard Latin Music Awards.

In other media
The title track appears as a bonus song in the game Guitar Hero III: Legends of Rock and in the European version of Guitar Hero: On Tour.

In 2016 Mexican electro act Moenia interpolate fragments of the song "La Chispa Adecuada (Bendecida III)" for their track "Todo mal" featured on their latest release "Fantom".

Track listing

Personnel
 Alan Boguslavsky - Rhythm guitar
 Enrique Bunbury - vocalist
 Joaquin Cardiel - Bass
 Juan Valdivia - Lead guitar
 Pedro Andreu - Drums

Chart positions

References

External links
 Héroes del Silencio official Site

Héroes del Silencio albums
1995 albums
Albums produced by Bob Ezrin
EMI Records albums
Spanish-language albums